"Glamour Boys" is the third single released by Living Colour from their 1988 debut album Vivid. It was nominated for a Grammy for Best Rock Performance by a Duo or Group with Vocal in 1990. The song reached #31 on the Billboard Hot 100.

Lyrically, "Glamour Boys" discusses young men obsessed with aspects of high society such as clothing and parties. The chorus shouts "I ain't no glamour boy - I'm fierce!"

Track listings
 12" single

 UK 1
 "Glamour Boys" - 3:40
 "Which Way To America?" - 3:40
 "The Rap Track" - 7:41
 "Middleman" - 3:46

 UK 2
 "Glamour Boys" - 3:40
 "Cult Of Personalilty" (Live) - 4:54
 "Memories Can't Wait" - 4:31

 7" single

 UK 1
 "Glamour Boys" - 3:40
 "Which Way To America?" - 3:40

 UK 2
 "Glamour Boys" (Remix) - 3:40
 "Cult Of Personalilty" (Live) - 4:54

 CD single

 Single
 "Glamour Boys" - 3:40
 "Which Way To America?" - 3:40
 "The Rap Track" (conversation with Living Colour) - 7:41
 "Middleman" - 3:46

 Maxi-Single
 "Glamour Boys" (Remix) - 3:40
 "Middleman" (Live) - 3:52
 "Cult Of Personalilty" (Live) - 4:54
 "Open Letter (To a Landlord)" - 5:33

Charts

References

Living Colour songs
1988 singles
Song recordings produced by Mick Jagger
1988 songs
Songs written by Vernon Reid
Epic Records singles
Funk rock songs